Korinna Schumann is the politician from Austria who was serving as President of Federal Council of Austria fro, 1 July to 31 December 2022.

Personal life 
She was born in 10 April 1966 and became Vice President of Austrian Trade Union Federation in 2018.

References 

1966 births
Presidents of the Austrian Federal Council
Living people
Place of birth missing (living people)